Hazra may refer to:
Hazara people, of Afghanistan
Həzrə (disambiguation), two places in Azerbaijan
Hazra, India, near Kolkata